Palmer is a city in Pocahontas County, Iowa, United States. The population was 138 at the time of the 2020 census.

History
Palmer got its start in the year 1899, following construction of the Rock Island railroad through that territory.

Geography
Palmer is located at  (42.630929, -94.599948).

Palmer lies near the center of Manson crater, an impact structure buried by glacial till and outwash.

Demographics

2010 census
As of the census of 2010, there were 165 people, 85 households, and 40 families residing in the city. The racial makeup of the city was 95.8% White, 0.6% African American, 1.2% Native American, 1.2% from other races, and 1.2% from two or more races. Hispanic or Latino of any race were 1.2% of the population.

There were 85 households, of which 18.8% had children under the age of 18 living with them, 36.5% were married couples living together, 5.9% had a female householder with no husband present, 4.7% had a male householder with no wife present, and 52.9% were non-families. 43.5% of all households were made up of individuals, and 17.6% had someone living alone who was 65 years of age or older. The average household size was 1.94 and the average family size was 2.63.

The median age in the city was 47.8 years. 18.2% of residents were under the age of 18; 6.6% were between the ages of 18 and 24; 20.6% were from 25 to 44; 35.2% were from 45 to 64; and 19.4% were 65 years of age or older. The gender makeup of the city was 50.3% male and 49.7% female.

2000 census
As of the census of 2000, there were 214 people, 100 households, and 58 families residing in the city. The racial makeup of the city was 95.33% White, 3.74% African American, 0.47% Native American and 0.47% Asian.

There were 100 households, out of which 21.0% had children under the age of 18 living with them, 51.0% were married couples living together, 2.0% had a female householder with no husband present, and 42.0% were non-families. 38.0% of all households were made up of individuals, and 20.0% had someone living alone who was 65 years of age or older. The average household size was 2.14 and the average family size was 2.83.

In the city, the population was spread out, with 22.0% under the age of 18, 6.1% from 18 to 24, 21.5% from 25 to 44, 24.8% from 45 to 64, and 25.7% who were 65 years of age or older. The median age was 45 years. For every 100 females, there were 114.0 males. For every 100 females age 18 and over, there were 114.1 males.

The median income for a household in the city was $25,000, and the median income for a family was $45,250. Males had a median income of $27,778 versus $16,875 for females. The per capita income for the city was $17,775. About 10.9% of families and 16.5% of the population were below the poverty line, including 35.4% of those under the age of eighteen and 5.5% of those 65 or over.

Education
Pocahontas Area Community School District operates public schools. It was in the Palmer School District until July 1, 1993, when it consolidated into the Pomeroy–Palmer Community School District; on July 1, 2012, that district consolidated into the Pocahontas Area School District.

Sports
Palmer had many successful semi-pro baseball teams in the heyday of town teams.

Palmer's high school boys' basketball team had a long run of success in the 1980s, winning three straight state championships from 1986 to 1988.  Its teams scored record numbers of points, and its games were played in front of packed crowds.  Ultimately, the team won 103 straight games, setting the state record.

References

Cities in Pocahontas County, Iowa
Cities in Iowa